Stanisław Ostoja-Chrostowski (December 14, 1900 – November 13, 1947) was a Polish painter, woodcut artist and professor at the Warsaw Academy of Fine Arts. He began studying at the School of Fine Arts in Warsaw. He studied painting with Tadeusz Pruszkowski, woodcut with Władysław Skoczylas and commercial art with Edmund Bartłomiejczyk.

In 1936 he won a bronze medal in the art competitions of the Olympic Games for his "Dyplom Yacht Klubu" ("Yachting Club Certificate").

During World War II, he was active in the intelligence department of the underground Polish Home Army. After the war, he was elected as the rector of the rebuilt Academy of Fine Arts in Warsaw.

References

External links
 profile 

1900 births
1947 deaths
Academic staff of the Academy of Fine Arts in Warsaw
Olympic bronze medalists in art competitions
Golden Laurel of the Polish Academy of Literature
Olympic competitors in art competitions
Medalists at the 1936 Summer Olympics